McKague is a surname. Notable people with the surname include:

 Shirley McKague (1935–2020), American politician
 Yvonne McKague Housser (1898–1996), Canadian painter

See also
 McKeague